Beit Ha'Chidush (meaning House of Renewal in Hebrew) (BHC) is a Jewish congregation founded in 1995 in Amsterdam, Netherlands. It was founded by Jews, many of which were expats, with secular and religious backgrounds who wanted to create a welcoming, inspiring and renewed Jewish congregation. 
BHC is an independent modern and progressive community where anyone with a Jewish background, either paternal or maternal, is welcome. People with a non-Jewish partner are more than welcome to attend the services together with their partner. BHC is a community based on equality and inclusiveness and welcomes individuals of all genders and sexual orientations.

There are typically three Shabbat services each month: two on Friday evenings and one on Saturday morning, as well as services on Holidays. Since 1997 BHC uses the Uilenburger Synagogue (1766) for services. Once a month a tish is organized for members, this is a shabbat dinner with the rabbi at the home of one of the members. Beit Ha'Chidush organises since 2004 a yearly Pride Shabbat, a festive service on the first Friday night of August (unless 1 August falls on a Saturday, in that case its on the last Friday of July).

BHC organizes Jewish education for children (Ledor Wador), as well as shiurim (lessons) on Jewish topics for adults.

BHC is a democratic organization with elected board members and general assemblies. All important decisions are submitted to the members at the general assemblies which occur at least twice a year. BHC is also participatory: Members are encouraged to actively take part in all activities and also develop their own initiatives.

History
In 1995, a number of both secular as well as religious Jews, unsatisfied with the present Jewish congregations, made the move of starting their own congregation, different from the existing Jewish organisations. The first shabbat service of Beit Ha'Chidush was soon to be held on 1 December 1995. A short interview with the founders was published in the newspaper NRC in 1997. Several rabbis ('Flying rabbis') - mostly from progressive Jewish communities overseas - were in charge of the services. This changed on 1 May 2005, when German-born Elisa Klapheck became the community's first own rabbi; she is the first female rabbi in Dutch Jewish history. She led the congregation from 2005 until her departure in 2009 to Frankfurt. Since then Clary Rooda (at the time rabbi in training) and rabbi Hannah Nathans have led the services at Beit Ha'Chidush.
 
The community currently has some 70 active members, 50 'friends' and another 100 persons who visit services and activities on occasion. A new Torah was welcomed in the community on 23 May 2007. A new Aron Kodesh (the ark that contains the Torah scrolls) was installed in January 2017.  There are currently plans under way within the community to work together with the NVPJ on issues like Jewish burial and the circumcision of gerim.

Affiliation
Beit Ha'Chidush draws from traditional and modern Jewish sources. Inspiration is found in the Torah, the Talmud and other classical sources as well as in today's renewal thinkers and groups in Europe, Israel and the United States. Beit Ha'Chidush has strong ties to Jewish Renewal and Reconstructionist Judaism in the United States, Liberal Judaism in the United Kingdom, and to Humanistic Judaism. Since its establishment in 1995 Beit Ha’Chidush has been supported by many progressive rabbis in Europe and the United States. It is an associate member of  Liberal Judaism and cooperates with the Dutch Union for Progressive Judaism.
A large part of the BHC community hails from outside the Netherlands. The founding members of Beit Ha'Chidush were very much in favor of establishing a new community which was more diverse, open and renewed in comparison to the already existing Jewish communities in the Netherlands.

Trivia
 BHC is a big supporter of the Queer Shabbaton event, an annual weekend for LGBTQI+ Jews from all over the world that was held in 2005 and 2006 during the Amsterdam Gay Pride. The events took place at the Uilenburger Synagogue. Since 2004 there is also an annual Pride shabbat service.
 in 2010 BHC participated in the Gay Pride with its own boat. Here you can find a nice picture of the event.

External links
 Beit Ha'Chidush
 Beit Ha'Chidush Facebook group
 link to the Beit Ha'Chidush wikipedia page in Dutch: Beit Ha'Chidush

References

Jewish Dutch history
Synagogues in the Netherlands
Reform synagogues
Religious buildings and structures in Amsterdam
Judaism in Amsterdam
Reform Judaism in the Netherlands
Secular Jewish culture in Europe